James Shedden Palmer (October 13, 1810 – December 7, 1867) was an officer in the United States Navy during the Civil War. He was later promoted to rear admiral.

Biography
Palmer was born at Elizabethtown, New Jersey. He entered the United States Navy on August 26, 1824, as Ship's Boy, aboard . Palmer was appointed midshipman January 1, 1825. He commanded the Naval Station at New Orleans and the West Gulf Squadron during 1864. Appointed to command the West Indies Squadron in 1865, he was commissioned rear admiral on July 25, 1866, and died at St. Thomas, Virgin Islands.

Ranks held
 Ship's Boy – August 26, 1824
 Midshipman – January 1, 1825
 Passed Midshipman – June 4, 1831
 Lieutenant – December 17, 1836
 Commander – September 14, 1855
 Captain – July 16, 1862
 Commodore – February 7, 1863
 Rear Admiral – July 25, 1866

Civil War service
Palmer was commanding officer of Iroquois, which was part of the U.S. Mediterranean Squadron at the time of the attack on Fort Sumter. He returned to the United States in January 1862, where he was on leave, without orders, until March, when he was re-appointed commander of the Iroquois. He saw service as part of Farragut's Western Gulf Blockading Squadron, and was one of the captains present at the attack and capture of New Orleans, and at Farragut's attempt to do the same at Vicksburg in 1862. Promoted to captain for his role in the victory at New Orleans in July of that year, the following month he took command of Farragut's flagship Hartford. On 7 February 1863, Palmer was promoted to Commodore.

He held this post until November 1864. He was then acting commander of Farragut's squadron during the latter's absence from November 1864 to February 1865. He then reverted to his previous post, which he held until May 1865. He was promoted to rear admiral on 25 July 1865.

Postbellum career
From May through December 1865, Palmer held administrative posts in Washington, D.C. That December he was appointed commander of the North Atlantic Squadron, with  serving as his flagship. On July 25, 1866, he was promoted to the rank of rear admiral. While still commanding the North Atlantic Squadron, Rear Admiral James S. Palmer died of yellow fever at St. Thomas, Virgin Islands. He was buried in New York City.

Namesake
The destroyer  was named for him.

See also

 Bibliography of American Civil War naval history
 Union Navy
 Confederate Navy

Bibliography
  Url

Further reading
  Url

References

 

1810 births
1867 deaths
Deaths from yellow fever
United States Navy admirals
Union Navy admirals
People of New Jersey in the American Civil War
Infectious disease deaths in the United States Virgin Islands